Burj Park III is an cancelled residential building to be built in Downtown Burj Dubai, Dubai, United Arab Emirates. It will have 60 floors and will be surrounded by the Burj Dubai Lake Park.

See also
Downtown Dubai
List of tallest buildings in Dubai

References
Emporis.com
Ameinfo.com

Proposed skyscrapers in Dubai